The year 1969 was the 188th year of the Rattanakosin Kingdom of Thailand. It was the 24th year in the reign of King Bhumibol Adulyadej (Rama IX), and is reckoned as year 2512 in the Buddhist Era.

Incumbents
King: Bhumibol Adulyadej 
Crown Prince: (vacant)
Prime Minister: Thanom Kittikachorn
Supreme Patriarch: Ariyavongsagatanana V

Events
28-30 June - His Majesty King Bhumibol Adulyadej welcome and met US President Richard Nixon for a visit.

 
Years of the 20th century in Thailand
Thailand
Thailand
1960s in Thailand